The Tripoli Sanjak was a prefecture (sanjak) of the Ottoman Empire, located in modern-day Lebanon and Syria. The city of Tripoli was the Sanjak's capital. It had a population of 175,063 in 1914.

Subdistricts 
The sanjak was made up of four districts (kazas):
 Kaza of Tripoli (Trablus-Şam)
 Kaza of Qalʿat al-Ḥuṣn (Hısnü'l Ekrâd)
 Kaza of Safita (Şafita)
 Kaza of Akkar

References

Tripoli, Lebanon
States and territories established in 1549
Sanjaks of Ottoman Syria
1549 establishments in the Ottoman Empire
1917 disestablishments in the Ottoman Empire